David Riehm (born May 19, 1988) is an American writer and filmmaker most known for his essay writings which led to his arrest, hospitalization and lawsuits.

References

 https://web.archive.org/web/20090129102002/http://www.courttv.com/news/riehm/docs/essays.html
 https://web.archive.org/web/20070426051931/http://www.startribune.com/462/story/1139780.html
 https://web.archive.org/web/20110527005050/http://wcco.com/topstories/local_story_114132131.html
 https://web.archive.org/web/20110717060117/http://wkbt.com/Global/story.asp?S=6421044

1987 births
Living people
American filmmakers